The Malta Summit was a meeting between US President George H. W. Bush and Soviet General Secretary Mikhail Gorbachev on December 2–3, 1989, just a few weeks after the fall of the Berlin Wall. It followed a meeting that included Ronald Reagan in New York in December 1988. During the summit, Bush and Gorbachev declared an end to the Cold War, although whether it was truly such is a matter of debate. News reports of the time referred to the Malta Summit as one of the most important since World War II, when British prime minister Winston Churchill, Soviet General Secretary Joseph Stalin and US President Franklin D. Roosevelt agreed on a post-war plan for Europe at the Yalta Conference.

Summit highlights

Brent Scowcroft and other members of the US administration were initially concerned that the proposed Malta Summit would be "premature" and that it would generate high expectations but result in little more than Soviet grandstanding. However, French President François Mitterrand, British Prime Minister Margaret Thatcher, other European leaders, and key members of the United States Congress prevailed upon President Bush to meet with Chairman Gorbachev.

No agreements were signed at the Malta Summit. Its main purpose was to provide the two superpowers, the United States and the Soviet Union, with an opportunity to discuss the rapid changes taking place in Europe with the lifting of the Iron Curtain, which had separated the Eastern Bloc from Western Europe for four decades. The summit is viewed by some observers as the official end of the Cold War. At a minimum, it marked the lessening of tensions that were the hallmark of that era and signaled a major turning point in East-West relations. During the summit, President Bush expressed his support for Gorbachev's perestroika initiative and other reforms in the Communist bloc.

At the summit, as a token, US President George Bush presented all participants of the conference a piece of the Berlin Wall. It was gathered on a presidential mission in which two pilots and four soldiers with sledgehammers were sent to Berlin where  were collected;  were given to the President and  given to members of the 207th Aviation Company.

Speaking at a joint news conference, the Soviet leader announced:

In reply, President Bush said:

Other participants
Also present at the Malta Summit were:

Soviet delegation
 Marshal of the Soviet Union Sergei Akhromeyev, military affairs adviser to Gorbachev
 Alexander Bessmertnykh, Soviet Deputy Foreign Minister 
 Anatoly Dobrynin, Soviet Ambassador to the United States from 1962 to 1986
 Eduard Shevardnadze, Soviet Foreign Minister 
 Alexander Yakovlev, chief ideologist of the Communist Party of the Soviet Union (CPSU) and Chairman of the International Policy Commission of the CPSU Central Committee

U.S. delegation
 James Baker, U.S. Secretary of State
 Robert Blackwill, then Special Assistant to the President for National Security Affairs and Senior Director for European and Soviet Affairs at the National Security Council
 Jack F. Matlock, Jr., U.S. Ambassador to the Soviet Union
 Condoleezza Rice, then Director for Soviet and East European Affairs at the National Security Council
 Brent Scowcroft, U.S. National Security Adviser
 Raymond Seitz, U.S. Assistant Secretary of State for European and Canadian Affairs
 John H. Sununu, White House chief of staff
 Margaret Tutwiler, U.S. Assistant Secretary of State for Public Affairs and Spokeswoman of the Department
 Paul Wolfowitz, U.S. Under Secretary of Defense for Policy
 Robert Zoellick, Counselor of the Department of State

Venue: "From Yalta to Malta", and back

The meetings took place in the Mediterranean, off the island of Malta. The Soviet delegation used the missile cruiser Slava, while the US delegation had their sleeping quarters aboard . The ships were anchored in a roadstead off the coast of Marsaxlokk. Stormy weather and choppy seas resulted in some meetings being cancelled or rescheduled, and gave rise to the moniker the "Seasick Summit" among international media. The meetings ultimately took place aboard Maksim Gorkiy, a Soviet cruise ship chartered to West German tour company Phoenix Reisen, which anchored in the harbor at Marsaxlokk.

The idea of a summit in the open sea is said to have been inspired largely by President Bush's fascination with World War II President Franklin D. Roosevelt's habit of meeting foreign leaders on board naval vessels.  The choice of Malta as a venue was the subject of considerable pre-summit haggling between the two superpowers.  According to Condoleezza Rice:

The choice of venue was also highly symbolic. The Maltese Islands are strategically located at the geographic centre of the Mediterranean Sea, where east meets west and north meets south. Consequently, Malta has a long history of domination by foreign powers. It served as a British naval base during the 19th and early 20th centuries, and suffered massive destruction during World War II. Malta declared its neutrality between the two superpowers in 1980, following the closure of British military bases and the North Atlantic Treaty Organization Regional Headquarters (CINCAFMED), previously located on Malta. Neutrality is entrenched in the Constitution of Malta, which provides as follows, at section 1(3):

On February 2, 1945, as the War in Europe drew to a close, Malta was the venue for the Malta Conference, an equally significant meeting between US President Franklin D. Roosevelt and British Prime Minister Winston Churchill prior to their Yalta meeting with Joseph Stalin. The Malta Summit of 1989 signaled a reversal of many of the decisions taken at the 1945 Yalta Conference.

See also
 Soviet Union–United States relations
 Malta–United States relations
 Cold War (1985–1991)
 Revolutions of 1989
 Soviet Union–United States summits
 Governors Island Summit
 Helsinki Summit (1990)
 New world order (politics)

References

Further reading
McGeorge Bundy, "From Cold War Toward Trusting Peace", in Foreign Affairs:  America and the World 1989/1990, Vol. 69, No. 1.
BBC News: "1989 - Malta Summit Ends Cold War".
CNN: Cold War Interviews, Episode 23: "The Wall Comes Down", an Interview with George H.W. Bush
CNN: Cold War Interviews, Episode 24: Transcripts from Malta Summit
 David Hoffman, "Bush and Gorbachev Hail New Cooperation", Washington Post (December 4, 1989)
 Richard Lacayo, "Turning Visions into Reality", in Time (online): December 11, 1989
 Romesh Ratnesar, "Condi Rice Can't Lose", in Time (online): September 20, 1999

Cold War
Birżebbuġa
1989 in Malta
1989 in the Soviet Union
1989 in the United States
1989 conferences
1989 in international relations
1989 in politics
December 1989 events in Europe
Diplomatic conferences in Malta
Presidency of George H. W. Bush
Mikhail Gorbachev
Soviet Union–United States diplomatic conferences
Malta–Soviet Union relations
Malta–United States relations